LDH70 are a type of diesel-hydraulic locomotive adapted from the TCDD DH7000. LDH 70 units are primarily used in shunting and slow moving freight operations.

External links
 Tülomsaş page on DH7000
 Trains of Turkey page on DH7000

References
 LDH 70-001 TEKNİK DETAYLAR RYK- ALPULLU

Tülomsaş locomotives
B-B locomotives
Standard gauge locomotives of Turkey